Acrobasis klimeschi is a species of snout moth in the genus Acrobasis. It was described by Roesler, in 1978. It is found on the Canary Islands.

References

Moths described in 1978
Acrobasis
Moths of Africa